Tamara Todevska (pronounced , born 1 June 1985), also known mononymously as Tamara, is a Macedonian pop singer.

Tamara began her music career in 2003 following the release of her debut studio album Sino. She has won on various music competitions throughout her career such as MAKFest in 2006 and Skopje Fest in 2007.

She has represented the Republic of North Macedonia in the Eurovision Song Contest on two occasions; in 2008, where she failed to qualify for the finals, performing the song "Let Me Love You" with Vrčak and Adrian Gaxha, and in 2019, she placed seventh in the final with the song "Proud", earning the country their best result in the contest ever.

Todevska is the younger sister of singer Tijana Dapčević, and they have collaborated several times.

Life 
Tamara Todevska was born in Skopje. She was raised in a musical family. Her father, Velko Todevski, is a Macedonian professor in a music school and her mom, Brana, is a Bosnian Serb opera singer. Tamara's mom influenced her deep, operatic vocal style.

Her older sister is Tijana Dapčević. On 27 June 2015, Tamara married former basketball player Aleksandar Dimitrovski. They have one daughter named Hana and one son Daren.

Career 
Her first official song is a duet with her sister Tijana called "Igra luda" (Crazy game), released in 1997. Her music career broke through in 2003 when she sang "1003" at the Montenegrin festival Budva, where she placed 2nd.
 
In 2005, her first album was realized under the title Sino (English translation "Blue"). The music producer and composer of this album is Aleksandar Masevski with whom had Tamara cooperated since 2004. The album won Album of the year (2005). Hits from that album are: "Sino", "Molci, molci" (ft. Ronin), "A, shto ako?", "Ljubovna prikazna" (ft. Ugro), "Najverni prijateli", "Ljubi, ljubi" (duet with Tuna), "Shetaj" etc.
 
Tamara was successful during the Macedonian Eurovision selection. She gained 105 points, placing second with the song "Kazi Koj Si Ti" ("Tell Me Who You Are").
 
In February 2008, Tamara won the Skopje Fest 2008 with the composition "Vo ime na ljubovta" featuring Rade Vrchakovski and Adrian Gaxha, thus gaining right to represent Macedonia in the Eurovision Song Contest 2008. The song was a hit in the Balkans, and was predicted to do well in the Eurovision. The song was sung in six languages (Macedonian, English, Serbian, Turkish, Russian and Albanian) and the quality video was made by Dejan Milicevic. In the Eurovision Song Contest 2008, which was held in Belgrade, Serbia, they performed in the second semi-final on the number 18. They sang the English version of "Vo ime na ljubovta" called "Let Me Love You" and reached 10th place in the semifinal. With the decision of the jury they failed to qualify.
 
Todevska represented North Macedonia in the Eurovision Song Contest 2019 in Tel Aviv with the song “Proud”. In the final, she finished in seventh place with 305 points and placed first in the jury vote. This is North Macedonia’s best result at the contest.

In December 2019, Tamara participated in the 21st edition of Kënga Magjike with the song "Monsters" and finished fifth overall.

Discography

Albums 
 Sino (2005)
 Eden Den (2015)

Singles 
 1997 "Igra luda" (feat. Tijana Dapčević - Skopje Fest)
 2002 "Dali znam"
 2002 "Koga bi mozela" (feat. Branka Todevska - Ohrid Fest)
 2003 "1003" (Suncane Skale)
 2004 "Sex"
 2004 "Sino"
 2004 "Molci molci" (ft. Ronin) - cover of Nina Spirova's song - Kirilico Ispeana (2009)
 2005 "Najverni Prijateli"
 2005 "Ljubi, ljubi" (duet with Tuna)
 2005 "Šetaj"
 2005 "A, što ako?"
 2005 "Ljubovna prikazna" (ft. Ugro)
 2006 "Losa Devojka"
 2006 "Sedmo Nebo" (feat. Vrčak - winner of MakFest)
 2007 "Kaži Koj Si Ti" (runner up of Nacionalen Evrosong)
 2007 "Luda" (feat. DNK, Vrčak)
 2007 "Za Makedonija" (feat. Toni Zen - Makedonija Naviva)
 2007 "Smešhno zar ne" (MakFest)
 2008 "Vo ime na ljubovta/Let me love you/Tebe volim/Yoksun/Vo imja ljobovi/Dashuri Mistike" (feat. Vrčak & Adrian Gaxha, Skopje Fest winner, Macedonian entry for Eurovision Song Contest)
 2008 "So maki sum se rodila" (old Macedonian folklore song sung by Tamara in techno version  - Makedonija Zasekogaš)
 2008 "Dajem Ti Sve" (Budva Fest)
 2009 "Usne ko krv" (Serbian Radio-Festival)
 2009 "Una magia Pandev" (feat. Toni Zen)
 2009 "Šarena Pesma" (Budva Fest)
 2009 "Davam Jas Se" (Dajem Ti Sve - Macedonian cover)
 2019 "Proud" (North Macedonia's entry for Eurovision Song Contest)
 2019 "Monsters"
 2020 "Sloboda"
 2020 "Rise" (English-language version of "Sloboda")
 2021 "Porok"

Compilations 
 2007 Makedonija Naviva
 2008 Makedonija Zasekogaš
 2009 Kirilico Ispeana

See also 
 Music of North Macedonia
 North Macedonia in the Eurovision Song Contest 2008 
 North Macedonia in the Eurovision Song Contest 2019

References

External links 

 
Tamara Todevska on YouTube

1985 births
Living people
Musicians from Skopje
21st-century Macedonian women singers
Macedonian pop singers
Macedonian people of Bosnia and Herzegovina descent
Macedonian people of Serbian descent
North Macedonia LGBT rights activists
Eurovision Song Contest entrants for North Macedonia
Eurovision Song Contest entrants of 2008
Eurovision Song Contest entrants of 2019